Dollendorf is a village in the municipality of Blankenheim in the district of Euskirchen in the German state of North Rhine-Westphalia. It gives its name to the surrounding limestone depression (Kalkmulde).

History  
Dollendorf was incorporated into Blankenheim on 1 July 1969.

Sights 

 Catholic parish church of St. John the Baptist (14th century tower; nave built 1732–1736)
 War memorial to the fallen of the First World War; inaugurated on 30 May 1926
 Typical farmhouses from the 18th and 19th centuries.
 Chapel of St. Anthony of Padua (on the stations of the cross between Dollendorf and Schloßthal)
 Dollendorf Castle ruins
 Neuweiler Castle not far from Ahrhütte, below Schloßthal (wall remains)
 Haus Vellen or Vellerhof (Clemens-Josef-Haus), courtyard building from the 18th century with chapel and its own cemetery.

References

Literature  
 Franz-Josef Außem: Die Pflanzenwelt in der Dollendorfer Kalkmulde in der Eifel. Cologne, 1994. 
 Johannes Becker: Geschichte der Pfarreien des Dekanats Blankenheim. Cologne, 1993, pp. 461 ff.
 Christoph Bungartz, Ralf Gier, Peter Scheulen: Von der Eifel nach Amerika. Auswanderung nach Nordamerika 1840–1914. Euskirchen, 2005. 
 Hermann Bungartz: Dollendorf/Eifel. Landschaft und Geschichte.,  2nd expanded edn., Hillesheim, 1989
 Dollendorf. Bilder eines Eifeldorfes., Cologne, 1993
 Peter Neu: Rheinischer Städteatlas. Dollendorf, Bonn 1976
 Ernst Wackenroder: Die Kunstdenkmäler des Kreises Schleiden, Düsseldorf, 1932, pp. 98–108

External links 
 Our Dollendorf

Euskirchen (district)
Former municipalities in North Rhine-Westphalia